Greer County is a county located along the southwest border of the U.S. state of Oklahoma. As of the 2010 census, the population was 6,239. Its county seat is Mangum.  From 1860 to 1896, the state of Texas claimed an area known as Greer County, Texas, which included present-day Greer County along with neighboring areas. In 1896 it was designated as a county in Oklahoma Territory under a ruling by the US Supreme Court. The rural Greer County is home to Quartz Mountain State Park, near the community of Lone Wolf, Oklahoma. It is also home to the Oklahoma State Reformatory, located in Granite. Its population has declined since 1930 due to changes in agriculture and migration to cities for work.

History
After a dispute over the 1819 Adams-Onís Treaty and the related 1828 Treaty of Limits, the governments of both the United States and the state of Texas claimed ownership of some 1.5 million acres (6,000 km2) in what was then operated as Greer County, Texas. The county was named for former Texas lieutenant governor, John A. Greer. Litigation followed, and in the case of United States v. State of Texas , with a ruling issued on March 16, the Supreme Court, having original jurisdiction over the case, decided in favor of the United States.

The county was assigned to the Oklahoma Territory on May 4, 1896. When Oklahoma was admitted as a state, Greer County was established according to its current boundaries; the remaining former county area was organized as Harmon, Jackson, and part of Beckham counties. The town of Mangum, designated as the county seat in 1886 when this was part of Texas, continued as the seat of Greer County, Oklahoma. From its establishment until at least 1903, Greer County was a sundown county, prohibiting African Americans from living in the county.

Originally developed for agriculture, the rural county had its peak of population in 1930. Mechanization of agriculture reduced the need for farm labor, and the population has declined as people migrated to cities for work.

Among the county attractions is Quartz Mountain State Park (known from 2002 to 2020 as Quartz Mountain Nature Park), near the community of Lone Wolf.

Geography

Western Greer County lies in the Gypsum Hills, while the eastern one-third is in the Red Bed Plains physiographic region. The county is drained by the North Fork Red River, Elm Fork Red River, and Salt Fork Red River.

Major highways
  U.S. Highway 283
  State Highway 6
  State Highway 9
  State Highway 34

Adjacent counties
 Beckham County (north)
 Kiowa County (east)
 Jackson County (south)
 Harmon County (west)

Demographics

As of the census of 2000, there were 6,061 people, 2,237 households, and 1,442 families residing in the county.  The population density was 10 people per square mile (4/km2).  There were 2,788 housing units at an average density of 4 per square mile (2/km2).  The racial makeup of the county was 81.46% White, 8.78% Black or African American, 2.47% Native American, 0.26% Asian, 0.02% Pacific Islander, 3.99% from other races, and 3.02% from two or more races. 7.44% of the population were Hispanic or Latino of any race.

There were 2,237 households, out of which 25.60% had children under the age of 18 living with them, 51.00% were married couples living together, 9.60% had a female householder with no husband present, and 35.50% were non-families. 33.40% of all households were made up of individuals, and 19.80% had someone living alone who was 65 years of age or older. The average household size was 2.27 and the average family size was 2.87.

In the county, the population was spread out, with 20.00% under the age of 18, 9.10% from 18 to 24, 28.40% from 25 to 44, 22.40% from 45 to 64, and 20.00% who were 65 years of age or older. The median age was 40 years. For every 100 females there were 123.80 males. For every 100 females age 18 and over, there were 129.60 males.

The median income for a household in the county was $25,793, and the median income for a family was $30,702. Males had a median income of $24,318 versus $18,641 for females. The per capita income for the county was $14,053.  About 15.00% of families and 19.60% of the population were below the poverty line, including 28.40% of those under age 18 and 14.80% of those age 65 or over.

Politics

Economy
The county's economy has been based on farming and raising livestock. In 1907, the main crops were cotton, corn, oats, wheat and alfalfa. Livestock raised includes cattle, horses, mules, swine, sheep and goats.

The Oklahoma State Reformatory is located in Granite in the county and provides some jobs.

Communities

Cities
Mangum (county seat)

Towns
Granite

Willow

Unincorporated communities
Brinkman

Reed

Notable people
 Edward Everett Dale (1879–1972), historian; professor at the University of Oklahoma
 William T. Ponder (1891–1947), World War I flying ace
 Victor E. Wickersham (1906–1988), U.S. politician; member of the U.S. House of Representatives

See also
 National Register of Historic Places listings in Greer County, Oklahoma

References

External links

 Mangum Main Street
 Greer County Chamber of Commerce
 Old Greer County Museum & Hall of Fame 
 Greer County Extension Service
 Encyclopedia of Oklahoma History and Culture - Greer County
 Oklahoma Digital Maps: Digital Collections of Oklahoma and Indian Territory

 
1896 establishments in Oklahoma Territory
Populated places established in 1896
Sundown towns in Oklahoma